, or simply , is a neighborhood in Shibuya, Tokyo, Japan. The neighborhood is known for its small boutique shops, giving it the nickname "the Brooklyn of Tokyo." It is served by Daikan-yama Station on the Tokyu Toyoko Line.

Education
 operates public elementary and junior high schools.

Elementary school zoning is like this:
Sarugaku Elementary School (猿楽小学校): 1-12, most of 13 (except for two lots), 14-17, 18 (except for one lot), and 19-20-ban
Nagayato Elementary School (長谷戸小学校): two lots in 13-ban and one lot in 18-ban

All of Daikanyamacho is zoned to Hachiyama Junior High School (鉢山中学校).

Gallery

References

Neighborhoods of Tokyo
Shibuya